Dakara may refer to:

 Dakara, a planet from the Stargate franchise
 The Ruf Dakara, a German performance SUV